Antonio Rodríguez Saravia (born 28 January 1971), commonly known as Rodri, is a Spanish retired footballer who played as a forward, and is a manager. He is the current development coach of Villarreal CF.

Playing career
Born in Barcelona, Catalonia, Rodri joined FC Barcelona's youth setup in 1988 from Santfeliuenc FC, but was released in the following year. He subsequently joined FC Martinenc, and in January 1990 he moved to CD Teruel, in Segunda División B.

In the following five seasons, Rodri rarely settle into a club, representing FC Levante Las Planas, CF Igualada, CF Balaguer, Gimnàstic de Tarragona, UE Tàrrega and FC Santboià. In 1996 he signed for Tercera División side Palamós CF, helping in their promotion to the third division in 1998.

Rodri also had a brief stint at CF Gavà during the 1999–2000 season, but returned to Palamós after appearing rarely. He resumed his career with CF Peralada and UE Olot, retiring with the latter in 2004, aged 33.

Managerial career
Rodri started his career as Raül Agné's assistant at Girona FC in 2010. On 16 March 2012, he was appointed assistant manager at Olot, but was in charge of the first team along with Àlex Terma during his spell.

On 10 December 2012, Rodri left Olot and moved to Cádiz CF, again as Agné's second. On 25 November 2014 he returned to his previous club, now named first team manager.

Rodri was sacked on 22 February 2016 due to his poor results, and reunited with Agné at Real Zaragoza on 28 October. On 22 June of the following year, he returned to Nàstic after being named CF Pobla de Mafumet manager.

On 9 September 2017, after Lluís Carreras' dismissal, Rodri was named interim manager of the first team in Segunda División. His first professional match in charge occurred eight days later, a 3–1 home win against Albacete Balompié. After three wins in five matches, Rodri was confirmed as manager until the end of the season. On 29 January 2018, he was sacked.

On 25 September 2018, CD Tenerife announced that Rodri would join the technical staff, working as an assistant coach. 

On 13 November 2018, he was named Extremadura UD manager, with the club also in the second division; on 16 February 2019, he was dismissed.

In November 2020, Rodri was named manager of Andorran Primera Divisió club Inter d'Escaldes. He chose to depart the club on 22 February 2021, after being offered the role of Development Coach at La Liga club Villarreal. He subsequently followed Villarreal manager Unai Emery to join Premier League club Aston Villa in the same role in November 2022.

Managerial statistics

References

External links
Gavà profile  

1971 births
Living people
Footballers from Barcelona
Spanish footballers
Association football forwards
Segunda División B players
Tercera División players
CD Teruel footballers
CF Balaguer footballers
Gimnàstic de Tarragona footballers
UE Tàrrega players
FC Santboià players
Palamós CF footballers
CF Gavà players
UE Olot players
CF Peralada players
Spanish football managers
Segunda División managers
Segunda División B managers
UE Olot managers
CF Pobla de Mafumet managers
Gimnàstic de Tarragona managers
Extremadura UD managers
Villarreal CF non-playing staff